Reynard Motorsport vehicles

The Reynard 97I is an open-wheel racing car designed and built by Reynard Racing Cars that competed in the 1997 IndyCar season. It won the constructors' and drivers' titles later that year, being driven by Alex Zanardi.

References

American Championship racing cars
Reynard Motorsport vehicles